Little Post Office is a historic post office building located at Martinsville, Virginia. It was built in 1893, and is a small one-story, gable front brick building with a frame rear extension.  The exterior and one-room interior of the building are detailed in the Queen Anne style.  It was used as a contract post office by star route mail delivery supervisor John B. Anglin from 1893 to 1917.

It was listed on the National Register of Historic Places in 1997.  It is located in the East Church Street-Starling Avenue Historic District. It is now part of an art installation of the Piedmont Arts Association.

References

External links

Post office buildings on the National Register of Historic Places in Virginia
Government buildings completed in 1893
Queen Anne architecture in Virginia
Buildings and structures in Martinsville, Virginia
National Register of Historic Places in Martinsville, Virginia
Individually listed contributing properties to historic districts on the National Register in Virginia
1893 establishments in Virginia